Leon Lawrence Lewis (September 5, 1888 – May 21, 1954) was an American attorney, the first national secretary of the Anti-Defamation League, the national director of B'nai B'rith, the founder and first executive director of the Los Angeles Jewish Community Relations Committee, and a key figure in the spy operations that infiltrated American Nazi organizations in the 1930s and early 1940s. The Nazis referred to Lewis as "the most dangerous Jew in Los Angeles."

Early life 
Lewis was the son of Edward and Rachel Lewis, German Jewish immigrants who migrated to Wisconsin. He grew up in Milwaukee and attended the University of Wisconsin and George Washington University. Lewis received a J.D. degree from the University of Chicago Law School in 1913.

Career 
After graduating from law school, Lewis accepted the position of national secretary of the Anti-Defamation League, and began to work on discrimination cases in the Midwest.  When the United States entered World War I in 1917, Lewis enlisted and served in the Army infantry and Army intelligence in Germany, France, and England during and after the war, rising to the rank of major. In 1919 he returned to the U.S. and resumed his work fighting antisemitism for the ADL in Chicago and other parts of the Midwestern United States. Lewis and his family moved to Los Angeles in the late 1920s, where he founded the Los Angeles Jewish Community Committee (later known as the Jewish Federation Council of Greater Los Angeles, Community Relations Committee), from which he launched a major anti-Nazi spy ring and intelligence gathering operation, receiving funding from all of the Hollywood studio moguls and working in cooperation with local and federal authorities. With help from his assistant Joseph Roos, Lewis' work as spymaster resulted in the successful prosecution of multiple American Nazis before and during World War II, and the prevention of many acts of Nazi sabotage and assassinations on the West Coast of the United States. Lewis served as executive director of the Community Relations Committee for 17 years, after which he returned to his law practice.

Personal life 
Lewis married Ruth Lowenberg in 1920, and the couple had two daughters, Rosemary Mazlo (1922–1980) and Claire Read (1928–2015).  He died of a heart attack on May 21, 1954 in Pacific Palisades, California.

Legacy 
Lewis' personal and professional papers are archived in the Jewish Federation Council of Greater Los Angeles, Community Relations Committee Collection held in the University Library at California State University, Northridge.

In popular culture 
Leon Lewis is featured in the 2022 podcast Rachel Maddow Presents: Ultra for his heroic role in exposing the plot by the Silver Shirts and other heavily armed pro-Nazi groups in the U.S. to overthrow the federal government and install a fascist regime.

References

External links

1888 births
1954 deaths
Lawyers from Chicago
People from Los Angeles
People from Hurley, Wisconsin
Military personnel from Milwaukee
University of Wisconsin–Madison alumni
George Washington University alumni
University of Chicago Law School alumni
United States Army personnel of World War I
Jewish American attorneys
Anti-Defamation League members